Catwoman: Soulstealer is a 2018 young adult coming of age novel by Sarah J. Maas. It is the third novel in the DC Icons series, following Wonder Woman: Warbringer by Leigh Bardugo and Batman: Nightwalker by Marie Lu. The DC Icons novels retell the stories of renowned DC heroes in their adolescence before they become a superhero. Catwoman: Soulstealer features numerous DC characters including: Batwing, Harley Quinn, Poison Ivy, and The Joker.

The novel follows Selina Kyle, a teenager living in Gotham City, who must fight in the underworld to with the leopards to make ends meet. She continues to do so to support her sister who suffers from an illness. The authorities descend onto their shared apartment in an attempt to bring her sister to an orphanage. Selina attempts to flee from them, assaulting them in the process. A member of the League of Assassins offers to expunge her criminal record if she accompanies them. Kyle breaks off from them and returns to Gotham disguised as a socialite. She undertakes robberies of the biggest museums of the bank with the help of Poison Ivy and Harley Quinn to wreak havoc and enact revenge on the corrupt officials of Gotham City.

Upon release, Catwoman: Soulstealer received mixed reviews. Kirkus Reviews included it in its starred reviews. Common Sense Media considered the book mediocre, granting it a rating of three out of five stars, questioning the medium used to convey Catwoman's story.

Plot

Selina Kyle and her younger sister, Maggie, who suffers from cystic fibrosis, live in a run down apartment in Gotham City. To pay the rent and Maggie's medical expenses, she fights for Carmine Falcone, an underworld mob boss, who stages fights with a group of fighters known as the Leopards. As Maggie's condition worsens, Selina accompanies her to a doctor's appointment whereupon the clinic grows weary of Selina's living situation. After a fight, two police officers along with a social worker raid Selina's apartment. The social worker details the plans to send Maggie to a run down foster home, which infuriates Selina and compels her to attack the group of officers to create a path for Maggie to escape. Before she could do so, a police officer tasers her and renders her unconscious.

When Selina comes to, she finds herself in the company of Talia, one of the leaders of the League of Assassins, offers to expunge her criminal record if she agrees to fly to Italy with her. Considering that Selina's assault constitutes her third offense, she will face a hefty prison sentence. With this in mind, she accepts the offer and flies to Italy where she would spend the next two years training to become an assassin.

Two years later, Selina returns to Gotham as Holly Vanderhees, a fake identity of a socialite she creates for herself after stealing the personal information of Talia when she fled from the League of Assassins. She moves in across from Luke Fox, a war veteran who suffers from Post Traumatic Stress disorder and who as a result of experiencing racial discrimination, works in conjunction with the Gotham Police Department to rid the city of evil. As she arrives, the Fox family has a display of an artwork that is worth a hefty sum of cash. Selina attends this event as her socialite character; however, she leaves it halfway to don her Catwoman outfit. Once the spectacle has concluded, she swoops in and steals the artwork. As she flees the venue, she stumbles into Batwing. She taunts him, and thrashes him while taking a picture of him as she makes away with the valuable. She leaks the photo anonymously to the press to further humiliate Batwing.

Selina continues her crime spree unabated before she comes across Poison Ivy during one of her robberies. As she runs into her, she finds herself surrounded by a group of Falcone's cronies. Working with Ivy, she manages to neutralize them. As she continues her spree, Poison Ivy tags along, demanding a cut of the action. Selina acquiesces and the two work in tandem as they target larger venues. To increase the amount of risk, Selina suggests that Poison Ivy should recruit Harley Quinn to tag along with them. To entice Quinn, Selina promises to break the Joker out of prison if she partakes in her robberies. As they prepare for another heist, a wraith from the Assassin's, Tigris, stuns Selina and attempts to slay her. Selina escapes with some serious wounds, but this scene arouses the suspicion of her companions.

As the stakes increase, Selina and her group stake out their next target at an abandoned warehouse. As they prepare, the tension mounts as Harley becomes impatient with Selina's attempts to stall the Joker's prison escape and aims her weapons at Selina. Selina attempts to assuage her fears; before she could do so, a group of police officers storm the entrance of the facility. The group makes a headlong dash for the exit, which results in Ivy and Harley successfully escaping from the warehouse. As Selina trails them, she winds up being cornered by some police officers, who manage to detain her. Selena ends up in front of a set of cameras where the chief prosecutor removes Selena's mask, unmasking her true identity.

Once Selina is imprisoned, a group of Joker's associates bust her out of her prison. As she escapes from prison, she makes an agreement to meet up within the center of Gotham City to divulge the formula that she gleaned from a scientist that enables the Lazarus Pit, a phenomenon that restores one's wounds. Instead of meeting with the Joker, Selina heads for the hospital where Maggie resides. She escapes from the hospital with Maggie in tow. As she approaches her escape vehicle, Harley Quinn impedes their path. Selina tries to overcome her, but Quinn severely wounds her in the process. Realizing Selina's intentions, Poison Ivy subdues her so that Selina could reach the abandoned warehouse.

When Selina arrives at the warehouse, a group of assassins ambush her. Batwing catches a glimpse of this altercation, and taking note of Selina's feeble condition, he lures the two assassins out of the warehouse to buy Selina some time. Selina places Maggie in the Lazarus Pit, which heals her condition. As she does, she passes away. After Batwing finishes off the assassin's he enters to find Selina without a pulse. Poison Ivy converges on this scene and both she and Batwing resolve to put her in the Lazarus Pit. At first, the Pit cleans her wounds, but she still remains unconscious. After Maggie begs for her to wake up, Selina regains consciousness.

Once Gotham City's peace has been temporarily restored, Selina allows Maggie to live once again with her foster parents. Selina and Luke hold hands and they agree to become a couple. Afterwards, Selina meets up with Poison Ivy and they decide to live together and to build a new warehouse for themselves. Poison Ivy informs her that the police apprehended Harley Quinn in the aftermath of Selina's prison escape. After her arrest, Harley Quinn has come to her senses and has decided to attend therapy sessions to resolve her problems.

Characters
 Selina Kyle: The main protagonist of the novel who takes on the personality of Holly Vanderhees after stealing Talia's personal information. She originally fights for the Leopards in the underworld where she was an undefeated champion. She moves to Italy for a period of two years to train with the League of Assassin's. As she becomes disillusioned with the goals of the groups, she flees from them and returns to Gotham City to enact revenge on the rich who have corrupted Gotham City. Her alter ego is Catwoman.
 Luke Fox: The main hero of the novel. He works in tandem with the Gotham Police Department as Batwing. He vows to rid the city of crime although he has misgivings about the police department after the racial discrimination he observes. He is the son of a socialite family. His father works for Bruce Wayne's company.
 Poison Ivy: A villain whose main focus is to fight against climate change and to raise awareness of the destruction the environment. She begins her criminal ways after being experimented on as a teenager and uses what she learned therefrom to use natural concoctions to eliminate her enemies. She encounters Selina during a bank robbery, and the two decide to tag along as a group.
 Harley Quinn: The Joker's former girlfriend. Her main goal consists in freeing him from prison. Her participation in Selina's groups is entirely contingent on this stipulation.
 Maggie Kyle: Selina's younger sister who suffers from cystic fibrosis. Her prospects of surviving are dim, and once Selina leaves Gotham, a family decides to adopt her. The Lazarus Pit that Selina builds cures her of her illness and she returns to her foster parents.
 Maria Kyle: Selina and Maggie’s mother. Not much is known about her, she is not prominent in either of her daughter’s lives and she is in prison for unknown reasons.
 James Gordon: The head of the Gotham Police Department. He is the only individual from the squad whom Luke confides in. He coordinates with Luke to eliminate corruption and crime in Gotham.
 The Joker: The most notorious criminal in Gotham. The Joker's henchman manage to free him from prison and Selina leads him into a trap, which results in his incarceration once again.
 Talia al Ghūl: One of the leaders of the group of assassin's. She recruits Selina and Selina steals her identity to become a socialite in Gotham. When she realizes this, she dispatches a squad of assassins to put an end to Selina.
 Nyssa al Ghūl: A ruthless wraith who is in charge of the training of members of the League of Assassin's. She shows no mercy for trainees who fail to meet expectations and downplays the worries that Selina has for her sister.
 Carmine Falcone: Leader of an underworld group, the Leopards. He recruits women to engage in fights against people who owe him money. Near the end of the novel, he stations some of the Leopards in front of the hospital to protect Selina.

Critical reception
Michael Berry of Common Sense Media gave the novel a rating of three out of five stars, criticizing the method in which Maas told the story. He believes that a superhero character lends itself better to a graphic novel and the details of Catwoman's life are handled clumsily, but praised the novel for the humorous dialogue and the fights that further the plot. Nevertheless, he criticized the plot for stalling midway through the novel and consequently, considered this novel as one that only appeals to fans of Catwoman.

Kirkus Reviews had high praise for the novel, including it among its starred reviews. It praised Maas' knack for creating independent female characters that display a great depth of character. In particular, it praised Selina's character for her intelligence, adeptness and ambiguous sense of virtue and considered these traits to be a strong reflection of an antihero. In addition, Kirkus praised the novel for its diversity in ethnicities and sexual orientations and the tinge of romance that captivates the reader's attention.

Adaptation
Catwoman: Soulstealer was adapted into a DC Graphic Novel for Young Adults release. It is written by Louise Simonson and illustrated by Samantha Dodge. This adaptation was released on June 1, 2021.

References

External links 

Book Review - Catwoman: Soulstealer by Sarah J. Maas
Sarah J. Maas takes on a DC icon in Catwoman: Soulstealer — Read an excerpt
Catwoman: Soulstealer By Sarah J. Maas Is A Thrilling Superhero Origin Story — And You Can Start Reading Now
Catwoman: Soulstealer is Another DC Icons Success
Watch the Official Catwoman: Soulstealer by Sarah J. Maas Book Trailer!
Review: Catwoman: Soulstealer by Sarah J. Maas

Catwoman in other media
DC Comics novels